The Noisy-Diobsud Wilderness is a relatively small wilderness area in northwestern Washington state adjacent to North Cascades National Park.  Created in 1984, the Noisy-Diobsud contains  of steep valleys, subalpine lakes, and the summits of Anderson Butte and Mount Watson. It is part of Mount Baker National Forest.

The only maintained trail enters the west side of the wilderness from the Anderson Lakes road above Baker Lake.

References 

IUCN Category Ib
North Cascades of Washington (state)
Protected areas of Skagit County, Washington
Protected areas of Whatcom County, Washington
Wilderness areas of Washington (state)
Mount Baker-Snoqualmie National Forest
Protected areas established in 1984
1984 establishments in Washington (state)